The second and final series of the New Zealand television reality music competition The X Factor premiered on TV3 in February 2015. Pre-auditions began in October 2014. As well as again being open to singers aged 14 and over, the series was also open to bands, which had to contain no more than five members and have at least two singers. The contestants were split into the show's four traditional categories: Boys, Girls, Over 25s and Groups.

The series premiered on Sunday 15 February, and screened three nights per week (SundayTuesday) until March 15, when it returned to the regular schedule of two nights per week (SundayMonday). As well as being broadcast on TV3, the full series was also streamed live on TV3's website. The live shows were simulcast on More FM.

The series was again hosted by Dominic Bowden. Both former All Saints singer Melanie Blatt and Australian Idol winner Stan Walker returned to judge the series. They were joined by new judges, married couple Willy Moon and Natalia Kills until the first live show when they were both fired after bullying a contestant, then former The X Factor Australia judge Natalie Bassingthwaighte and I Am Giant drummer Shelton Woolright from the second live show.

The series was accompanied by spin-off show The Xtra Factor, which was hosted by Guy Williams, Sharyn Casey, and Clint Roberts, and screened on Four immediately after The X Factor.

As of February 2016, five acts from series 2 have been signed to a certain music label. Beau Monga, Mae Valley, Brendon Thomas and The Vibes were signed to Sony Music New Zealand, Stevie Tonks was signed to Christian music label "Parachute" and Finlay Robertson had received a grant by NZ On Air to release a single titled "Control".

Development
The X Factor was created by Simon Cowell in the United Kingdom and the New Zealand version is based on the original UK series. Broadcast funding agency NZ On Air contributed $800,000 as a minority investor, for the production of 41 episodes of 60 minutes duration each.

The series' broadcast sponsor is McDonald's, with Mazda, Fruttare, 2degrees and VO5 as programme partners.

The initial pre-audition tour of 13 towns and cities was held in October and early November 2014, with the judges' auditions round filmed in Auckland in late November and early December. The Boot Camp round was filmed in mid-January 2015 in Auckland.

Judges and host

In September, two of the judges from the first series, Stan Walker and Melanie Blatt, were confirmed to return as judges. The other two judges from the first series, Daniel Bedingfield and Ruby Frost, were confirmed as not returning for the second series, with Frost wanting to focus on her music career. In October the final two judges were confirmed as New Zealand-born singer Willy Moon and his wife, English singer Natalia Kills. 
On 16 March 2015, only hours before the second live results show, Kills and Moon were sacked from the show after a public backlash ensued against the couple after they berated a contestant's appearance on air during the first live show the previous night (15 March). More than 50,000 people signed a petition to get the couple sacked. For the show on 16 March, there were only two judges on the panel. The X Factor Australia judge Natalie Bassingthwaighte and New Zealand-born I Am Giant drummer Shelton Woolright were named as the replacements of Moon and Kills respectively.

In August 2014, Dominic Bowden was confirmed to return as the host of the second series.

Selection process

Pre-auditions
The first appeal for applicants was made on 24 August 2014, with the announcement of the application process and pre-audition tour details. Pre-auditions in front of the show's producers began on 11 October 2014 and travelled through 13 locations around New Zealand. This was a reduction from the 27 locations visited for the first series, with the second series focusing mainly on cities. Bands were also able to pre-audition in Auckland, Wellington and Christchurch or by uploading a performance video.

Judges' auditions

The auditionees chosen by the producers were invited back to the last set of auditions that took place in front of the judges and a live studio audience. These auditions were filmed at SkyCity Theatre in Auckland from 26 November to 2 December 2014 and broadcast from 15 February. The successful contestants then progressed to the Boot Camp round.

Notable returning auditionees included three contestants who had competed in the first series: Finlay Robertson, who made it to judges' retreats; Hannah Cosgrove, who reached the second day of Boot Camp; and Kalsey Goodall and Nofo Lameko, who also made it to Boot Camp. Stuss featured as Cassie Henderson's backing band in week eight of the first series' live shows. Steve Broad previously appeared on the second series of NZ Idol in 2005, where he placed third, and on Pop's Ultimate Star in 2007. Archie Hill and Rick Aslett  were two separate acts that appeared on series three of New Zealand's Got Talent (series 3) at the audition stage in 2013. Richard Aslett also went on to appear live as one of the "crowd favourites" at the finale of series 3 of NZGT in December 2013.

 Auditions 1 (15 February): Featured successful auditionees: Shayla Armstrong, Jazzy Axton, Brendon Thomas and the Vibes, Joe Irvine, Ralph Zambrano, Nofo Lameko, Beau Monga, Ellaphon Tauariki and Eb Skye.
 Auditions 2 (16 February) Featured successful auditionees: Michelle Beck, Liam Fitzsimon Cooper, Finlay Robertson, Matt Sainsbury, Tux Severne, Sarah Spicer and Stevie Tonks.
 Auditions 3 (17 February): Featured successful auditionees: Co-lab, Hannah Cosgrove, Dr3am, Fare Thee Well, Stuss and Urban Legacy.
 Auditions 4 (22 February): Featured successful auditionees: Yolanda Bartram, Steve Broad, Teea Cecil, Nyssa Collins, Malakai Funaki, Archie Hill, Ria Hoeta, The Kicks, Mansweat, Anthony O'Hagan, Julie Rogers and Reiki Ruawai.
 Auditions 5 (23 February): Featured successful auditionees: Ashy Batchelor, Lili Bayliss, Georgia Bishop, Abby Cristodoulou, Bethan Dunstone-Leith, Elae, Elijah and Leilani, Joseph Emanuel, Georgina Banfield, Hiki and Kerin, Llewellyn, Looking For Alaska, Kayla Mahon and Modulation.
 Auditions 6 (24 February): Featured successful auditionees: Emma Amiri-Ghaemmaghamy, Talitha Blake, Shae Brider, Alfonso Fabras, Sally Faherty, Irene Folau, Kalsey Goodall, Micah Heath, Matthew Herd, Liam Jolly, Lydia Lewis, Johnny Searle and Izaia Tilialo.

Boot Camp 

The Boot Camp round was filmed at Vector Arena in Auckland in mid-January 2015 and broadcast from 1 to 3 March. In the first part of Boot Camp, the 101 acts were divided into groups of eight and giving a song to sing. From here they were reduced down to a top 64 and were introduced to their category judge. In the six-seat challenge, the 12 acts in each category performed one song each for the judges and were allocated a seat or sent home. If all seats were filled, a swap had to take place with a previously seated contestant. Any contestant under 16 could not be swapped out if they were given a seat.

The 24 successful acts were:

 Boys: Micah Heath, Archie Hill, Nofo Lameko, Beau Monga, Reiki Ruawai, Stevie Tonks
 Girls: Jazzy Axton, Georgina Banfield, Lili Bayliss, Nyssa Collins, Sally Faherty, Finlay Robertson
 Over 25s: Talitha Blake, Steve Broad, Joseph Emanuel, Joe Irvine, Kayla Mahon, Sarah Spicer
 Groups: Brendon Thomas & the Vibes, Duel, Fare Thee Well, Modulation, Stuss, Urban Legacy

Judges' retreats 

The judges' retreats episodes were filmed over the month of February in locations in New Zealand and Thailand. Blatt	mentored the Over 25s in Pattaya, Thailand, assisted by Nicole Appleton; Kills took the boys to Titirangi, assisted by contestant of the first series of The X Factor Benny Tipene; Moon has the Groups in Karaka, with musician and former New Zealand's Got Talent judge Jason Kerrison; and Walker took the girls to Bangkok, assisted by Ginny Blackmore. Moon created a new group, country duo Mae Valley, made up of Abby Christodoulou and Hannah Cosgrove who had previously been eliminated at Boot Camp.

At the end of judges' retreats, it was announced that each judge could bring one further act back as a wildcard, with the public voting for which of the four wildcards would become the 13th contestant.

Key:
 – Wildcard Winner

Contestants
Key:
 – Winner
 – Runner-Up
 – Third Place

 The Boys category was originally mentored by Natalia Kills, while the Groups category was originally mentored by Willy Moon.

Live shows
The live shows began on 15 March 2015. The shows were filmed at The X Factor NZ Studio in Favona, Auckland. The finals were held in Vector Arena, in Auckland.

Results summary
Colour key
  – Act in the bottom two/three and had to perform in the final showdown
  – Act was in the bottom three but received the fewest votes and was immediately eliminated
  – Act received the lowest number of public votes and was immediately eliminated (no final showdown)

Live show details

Week 1 (15/16 March) 
 Theme: Judges' choice
 Musical guests: Savage & Timmy Trumpet ("Freaks"), Jackie Thomas ("Until the Last Goodbye")

 Judges' vote to eliminate
 Walker: Stuss – backed his own act, Lili Bayliss.
 Blatt: Lili Bayliss – sent the result to deadlock to be fair to Stuss, who had no mentor backing them at the time.

With the acts in the bottom two receiving one vote each, the result went to deadlock and reverted to the earlier public vote. Stuss was eliminated as the act with the fewest public votes.

 Notes
Kills and Moon appeared on Sunday's live show but were fired with immediate effect after bullying Joe Irvine. Monday's show went ahead with only Blatt and Walker appearing on the panel with Walker looking after Kills's Boys and Blatt looking after Moon's Groups.
Studio versions of the contestants' performances were released on iTunes starting this week. A series first.
On 23 March 2015, the performances of three acts entered the NZ Singles Chart. Stevie Tonk's performance of "Young and Beautiful" debuted at number 5, Mae Valley's performance of "If I Die Young" debuted at number 10, and Lili Bayliss' performance of "Rude" debuted at number 18.

Week 2 (22/23 March) 
 Theme: Biggest records right now
 Musical guests: Ginny Blackmore ("Love Me Anyway"), Jamie McDell ("Back Of My Mind")

 Judges' vote to eliminate
 Woolright: Nofo Lameko – backed his own act, Fare Thee Well.
 Bassingthwaighte: Fare Thee Well – backed her own act, Nofo Lameko.
 Blatt: Nofo Lameko – had never felt a connection with Lameko.
 Walker: Nofo Lameko – based on what he saw in the future for the performers.

 Notes
On 30 March 2015, Brendon Thomas and the Vibes' performance of "Budapest" debuted at number 12 on the NZ Singles Chart. Their performance of "Budapest" retained its spot at number 12 for a second week.

Week 3 (30/31 March) 
 Theme: Songs of summer
 Musical guests: Jason Kerrison ("You Want Me As Me"), Ricky Martin ("Mr. Put It Down")

 Judges' vote to eliminate
 Walker: Fare Thee Well – backed his own act, Lili Bayliss.
 Woolright: Lili Bayliss – backed his own act, Fare Thee Well.
 Bassingthwaighte: Fare Thee Well – gave no reason.
 Blatt: Fare Thee Well – thought Bayliss could hold a more sustainable career in the music industry.

 Notes
 This week's shows were moved to Monday and Tuesday nights to avoid the Sunday night show clashing with the final of the 2015 Cricket World Cup.
On 3 April 2015, Nyssa Collins performance of "How Will I Know" debuted at number 19 on the NZ Singles Chart.

Week 4 (6/7 April) 
 Theme: One-hit wonders
 Musical guests: Vince Harder ("Shot Me Down"), P-Money & Sid Diamond ("Truth Hurts")

 Judges' vote to eliminate
 Woolright: Sarah Spicer – backed his own act, Brendon Thomas and The Vibes.
 Blatt: Brendon Thomas and The Vibes – backed her own act, Sarah Spicer.
 Bassingthwaighte: Sarah Spicer – based her decision on who could sell more records.
 Walker: Brendon Thomas and The Vibes – could not decide and sent the result to deadlock.

With the acts in the bottom two receiving two votes each, the result went deadlock and reverted to the earlier public vote. Sarah Spicer was eliminated as the act with the fewest public votes.

 Notes
On 13 April 2015, the performances of two acts entered the NZ Singles Chart. Stevie Tonk's performance of "Crazy" debuted at number 5 and Lili Bayliss' performance of "Tainted Love / Sweet Dreams (Are Made of This)" debuted at number 14. Tonks' performance of "Crazy" managed to stay on the charts for a second week but dropped to number 18.

Week 5 (12/13 April) 
 Theme: Ed Sheeran vs. Taylor Swift
 Musical guest: Ed Sheeran ("Thinking Out Loud", "Bloodstream")
 Two acts were eliminated on the fifth live show. One is the act with the lowest number of public votes and the other act is decided by the judges in the final showdown.

 Judges' vote to eliminate
 Blatt: Nyssa Collins - backed her own act, Joe Irvine
 Walker: Joe Irvine - backed his own act, Nyssa Collins
 Woolright: Joe Irvine - based on their ability to sell records.
 Bassingthwaighte: Joe Irvine - gave no reason.

 Notes
 For a series first a charity single consisting of the Top 12 was created to raise money for Ronald McDonald House. The single was a cover version of Rachel Platten's "Fight Song". All money raised towards buying the single would go to Ronald McDonald House. The single's music video debuted on The Xtra Factor and was later released on iTunes which debuted at #2 soon climbing to #1
After her elimination on The X Factor, Finlay announced on The Xtra Factor that her save me song would've been "Tragedy" by Christina Perri. She later sang a line of the song on the show.
On 17 April 2015, the performances of three acts entered the NZ Singles Chart. Brendon Thomas and The Vibes' performance of "Make It Rain" debuted at number 13, Stevie Tonk's performance of "Give Me Love" debuted at number 14 and Mae Valley's performance of "Sparks Fly" debuted at number 20.

Week 6 (19/20 April) 
 Theme: Celebrities' choice
 Musical guest: Stan Walker (Medley from the album Truth & Soul) 
 Group performance (Top 13): "Fight Song"

 Judges' vote to eliminate
 Walker: Mae Valley - backed his own act, Lili Bayliss.
 Woolright: Lili Bayliss - backed his own act, Mae Valley.
 Blatt: Mae Valley - based on their ability to sell records.
 Bassingthwaighte: Mae Valley - gave no reason.

 Notes
 This week's song choices were individually chosen for each act by a New Zealand celebrity.
On 24 April 2015, the performances of two acts entered the NZ Singles Chart. Mae Valley's performance of "Landslide" debuted at number 17 and Beau Monga's performance of "Gold Digger" debuted at number 20.

Week 7 (26/27 April) 
 Theme: Musical heroes
 Musical guests: Gin Wigmore ("New Rush"), Avalanche City ("Inside Out")

 Judges' vote to eliminate
 Bassingthwaighte: Lili Bayliss - backed her own act, Stevie Tonks.
 Walker: Stevie Tonks - backed his own act, Lili Bayliss.
 Woolright: Lili Bayliss - thought that Tonks had the better voice.
 Blatt: Lili Bayliss - had been in the bottom two for the fourth time.

 Notes
 No songs from this week's performances appeared on New Zealand music charts.

Week 8: Quarter-Final (3/4 May) 
 Theme: Kiwi artists
 Musical guests: Tori Kelly ("Nobody Love"), The Script ("Paint the Town Green")

 Judges' vote to eliminate
 Bassingthwaighte: Steve Broad - backed her own act, Stevie Tonks.
 Blatt: Stevie Tonks - backed her own act, Steve Broad.
 Woolright: Steve Broad - felt Tonks would have a successful career in the music industry.
 Walker: Steve Broad - felt Tonks deserved to be in the competition longer.

Notes
 The remaining five acts were solely mentored by their given celebrity and then performed a song by that particular artist.
With the elimination of Steve Broad, Melanie Blatt has no more acts left.
No songs from this week's performances appeared on New Zealand music charts.

Week 9: Semi-Final (10/11 May) 
 Themes: Number ones, Songs for Mum
 Musical guests: Spandau Ballet ("Gold"), Benny Tipene ("Lanterns")

 Judges' vote to eliminate

 Woolright: Stevie Tonks – gave no reason, but effectively backed his own act, Brendon Thomas and The Vibes.
 Bassingthwaighte: Brendon Thomas and The Vibes – gave no reason, but effectively backed her own act, Stevie Tonks.
 Walker: Stevie Tonks – based on the final showdown performance.
 Blatt: Stevie Tonks – based on the final showdown performance.

Notes
 For the first time this series, each act performed two songs.
 This was the final week where a final showdown decided who would go home for this series.
 The competing acts of the sixth series of the New Zealand version of Dancing With the Stars were announced during ninth results show.
 No songs from this week's performances appeared on New Zealand music charts.

Week 10: Final (17/18 May)

17 May 
 Themes: Party songs, Judges' choice
 Musical guest: I Am Giant ("Kiss From A Ghost")

18 May 
Themes: Audition song, Winner's single
Group Performance: "I'm Not the Only One"/"I Need A Dollar"
Musical guests: Stan Walker and Natalie Bassingthwaighte ("Signed, Sealed, Delivered (I'm Yours)")

Notes 

On 22 May 2015, the performances of two acts entered the NZ Singles Chart. Beau Monga's performance of "The Roimata Song" debuted at number 7 and Nyssa Collins' performance of "Don't Dream It's Over" debuted at number 8.

Charity single 
In April it was announced that the finalists had recorded a charity single, a cover of Rachel Platten's single "Fight Song". The charity single was released on 13 April is in aid of Ronald McDonald House Charities in New Zealand. The single debuted at number 13 on the Official New Zealand Singles Chart. The final 13 acts performed the song live on the week six results show.

Reception

Critique and controversies

Producer interference 

In December 2014, vlogger Brad Fisher claimed that during a taping of the judges' auditions, he saw the show's producer giving the judges hand signals to guide them on which contestants to put through to Boot Camp. However, judge Stan Walker denied the claims, saying that while the producers give the judges background information on the contestants, it was up to the judges to choose who goes through.

Natalia Kills outburst 

During the filming of the final judges' auditions session in December 2014, while giving feedback to busker Sally Faherty, judge Natalia Kills used strong language, including profanity, to admonish audience members. Some members of the audience were shocked at the outburst and walked out. A TV3 spokeswoman said both the network and Kills apologised for the incident. The incident was featured in the final audition episode, with the profanity bleeped out. Faherty was also heard using bleeped language backstage.

Shae Brider 

In the sixth audition show, singer Shae Brider auditioned and was put through to the Boot Camp round. In the episode, Brider revealed that he had been involved in a 2004 murder in Wanganui and had served six years in prison for manslaughter. In reaction to criticism from the public and media, MediaWorks New Zealand issued a statement saying that Brider's criminal record had been fully disclosed when he entered The X Factor and that the New Zealand justice system considers that Brider has paid his debt to society and apologised for any distress the episode may have caused viewers. Donna Travers, the mother of Brider's victim, told media she was "devastated" by Brider's X Factor appearance and felt "revictimised". Brider later told media that he regretted appearing on the series and had not thought through the impact of his appearance. TV3 announced that the first two bootcamp episodes would start with an apology to Travers and her family. International The X Factor producers FremantleMedia Australia and Syco Entertainment discussed the situation with the show's producers, with a spokesperson for FreemantleMedia describing the inclusion of Brider on the show was "a very poor editorial decision" and that "a more rigid approval process" would ensure a similar situation would not happen in future.

Berating of contestant
During the first live show, Kills bullied and humiliated Joe Irvine during the judges' comments, stating that there was "a doppelganger in our midst". Kills called out Irvine on his apparent copying of her husband, Willy Moon's hairstyle and dress sense. Kills deemed the contestant a "laughing stock", overtly "cheesy" and "disgusting". Moon continued her rant, saying that Irvine was "like Norman Bates dressing up in his mother's clothing, it's just a little bit creepy". Viewer response to the comments was overwhelmingly negative, with some calling for Kills and Moon to be fired from the show mid-series, some calling them out on their hypocrisy about originality and others simply stating the comments to be disgusting themselves. A Facebook page demanding the two be fired was set up on 15 March 2015, and within twelve hours had amassed over 50,000 likes. The incident led to criticism from the show's sponsors, franchise owner and fellow judges.

Moon and Kills were both fired from the show the day after the incident and left Auckland for Los Angeles. Upon arrival in Los Angeles, Kills made her first public comments on the controversy by wishing luck to Joe Irvine and those in her former category luck in the competition, dismissing the idea of a "manufactured conspiracy" and also stated that "there are many sides to this story". The following day both Kills and Moon made further comments via Twitter, with Kills explicitly apologising to Joe Irvine, while Moon wished him luck in the competition. Kills and Moon were replaced by former X Factor Australia judge Natalie Bassingthwaighte and New Zealand-born drummer Shelton Woolright respectively with immediate effect from the second live show.

Ratings
 The premiere episode for the second season had an average audience of 343,280. Down 26% from the previous season
 Overall over 1.3 million people watched the first week of the second series.
 Overall the series had an average audience of 328,160 viewers. Down 18% from the average of the previous season.

N.Z. Nielsen ratings
 Colour key:
  – Highest rating during the season
  – Lowest rating during the season

References

External links

New Zealand 02
2015 New Zealand television seasons
series 02
Television controversies in New Zealand
2015 scandals